The Dangerous Alliance was a professional wrestling stable who was active in the American Wrestling Association (AWA) in 1987 and 
in World Championship Wrestling (WCW) and Extreme Championship Wrestling in the early 1990s. The group derives its name from "Paul E. Dangerously", the ring name of its founder and manager Paul Heyman.

History

American Wrestling Association (1987–1988) 
In the spring of 1987, Paul E. Dangerously formed The Dangerous Alliance with Adrian Adonis and The Midnight Express (Dennis Condrey and Randy Rose) in the American Wrestling Association (AWA).

In October 1987, Dangerously successfully led Condrey and Rose to win the AWA World Tag Team Championship from Mid-South legends Jerry Lawler and Bill Dundee, only to lose the titles to The Midnight Rockers (Shawn Michaels and Marty Jannetty) two months later. Dangerously also helped Adonis in his feud with Tommy Rich and his bid to win the AWA International Television Championship, in which Adonis lost the title in a tournament final to Greg Gagne. By 1988, the Dangerous Alliance disbanded, as Dangerously, Condrey, and Rose left the AWA, while Adonis died that July in a van accident during a tour in Canada.  

In 1988, Dangerously and the husband and wife duo of Eddie Gilbert and Missy Hyatt reused the Dangerous Alliance name for their manager/wrestler/valet partnership in the CWA and Continental territories.  By the end of the year, all three were signed to WCW.

World Championship Wrestling

Halloween Havoc (1991) 
After Dangerously was "fired" as an announcer for World Championship Wrestling, the precursors to resurrecting his stable came at the Halloween Havoc pay-per-view in Chattanooga, Tennessee. Prior to the show, announcer Eric Bischoff was working as a valet in the parking lot. When Dustin Rhodes and Barry Windham pulled up and got out of their car, the reigning World Tag Team Champions Arn Anderson and Larry Zbyszko ran up to Bischoff and Windham and slammed the car door on Windham's hand, breaking it. It was from this incident that Zbyszko gained his nickname from around this time, "The Cruncher".

Later at the same show, the mysterious WCW Halloween Phantom appeared, and squashed Tom Zenk in a match using a reverse neckbreaker. Then, in an interview segment with Bischoff, Dangerously brought out the Phantom and had him unmask to reveal the returning "Ravishing" Rick Rude. Dangerously stated that even though he had been fired as a commentator, he still had his manager's license, and would use Rude to exact his revenge on the company that fired him.

Clash of the Champions XVII 
The storyline was furthered at Clash of the Champions XVII on November 19, 1991 in Savannah, Georgia. At the beginning of the Clash, which was televised live on TBS, WCW United States Heavyweight Champion (and perennial face) Sting was in the ring doing an interview. Madusa came out dressed as a harem girl and distracted Sting so WCW World Heavyweight Champion Lex Luger could attack him from behind by clipping his knee, the same one Sting injured in February 1990. Luger then bashed the knee against the runway repeatedly to make it seem like Sting had suffered severe damage. Several face wrestlers, including Bobby Eaton, ran out to run the heel Luger off and take Sting to the hospital. Sting, however, had to defend his title against Rude that night and did not want to leave. Eaton kept telling him he would have time, so he left. Bischoff rode in the ambulance with Sting and gave live updates on the condition of Sting from the hospital between matches to announcers Jim Ross and Tony Schiavone. Meanwhile, Dangerously had found a loophole in the match contract that specifically stated that if Sting was not able to defend his title, he would have to forfeit it to Rude. The announcers relayed the message to Bischoff, who in turn passed it along to Sting. Commotion could be heard in the background as Sting tried to leave the hospital and return to defend his title. It turned out that Eaton had been conspiring with Dangerously and Rude to ensure Sting did not make it out in time for his title defense.

When it came time for the match, Sting was a no-show and Dangerously declared Rude the United States Heavyweight Champion (which had been their plan all along). The telecast featured a split screen of the ambulance arriving at the back area of the arena with Sting's knee wrapped up. Dangerously demanded referee Nick Patrick start the match and count Sting out, but he kept interrupting the count which allowed Sting enough time to make it out to the ring. After having trouble finding the right door to enter the building, his fight song started playing and Sting limped out. Rude met him at the runway with punches but Sting was so pumped he took it to him instead and the match was underway. Rude defeated Sting, mainly due to his injured knee, with a small package pin. On the following episode of World Championship Wrestling (this was before Monday Nitro), Dangerously announced the formation of the Dangerous Alliance, which included Rude, Eaton, Anderson, Zbyszko, Madusa, and ”Stunning” Steve Austin.

Notable feuds 
The Dangerous Alliance went on to dominate WCW for the next six months, as Anderson and Eaton won the WCW World Tag Team Championship and Austin held the WCW World Television Championship for a time. Their main feuds were with Sting, Ricky Steamboat, Barry Windham, Dustin Rhodes, and Nikita Koloff. The Alliance and its rivals went back and forth until they settled their issues in a gruesome "WarGames" match at WrestleWar (1992). During the match, Rude removed the turnbuckle from the post; Zbyszko tried to hit Sting with the metal hook, but ended up hitting his stablemate Eaton instead, allowing Sting to apply an armbar to Eaton and garner a submission victory for his team. After the match, Zbyszko was expelled from the Alliance, which began the group's downfall.

WCW downfall 
Rude and Madusa went their own separate way and had much success. Anderson and Eaton started running with Michael Hayes, but they came back to Dangerously when he fired Madusa publicly at Halloween Havoc in October and she came after him, Austin went on forming a tag team with Flyin Brian. By the end of November 1992 after the Clash of the Champions XXI, the Dangerous Alliance had disbanded after Dangerously left after a bitter contract dispute.

Arn Anderson, in an interview video with RF Video, referred to the Dangerous Alliance as one of the greatest gatherings of talent ever. However, Anderson opined that it never became a memorable group because of WCW's incompetent bookers (i.e. Jim Herd, Kip Allen Frey, and Bill Watts) failing to promote stars.

Eastern/Extreme Championship Wrestling (1993–1995) 
Dangerously revived the Dangerous Alliance in NWA Eastern Championship Wrestling (NWA-ECW) in 1993 with Jimmy Snuka, Don Muraco, The Dark Patriot and "Hot Stuff" Eddie Gilbert. On the October 19th, 1993 episode of ECW Hardcore TV, Paul Heyman introduced a new Dangerous Alliance featuring ECW Heavyweight Champion Shane Douglas and Sherri Martel as Director of Covert Operations. When Heyman attempted to introduce Sabu as the bodyguard, Shane Douglas balked and stated that he was not consulted on this decision. Sherri Martel sided with Shane Douglas and the arguments continued in the locker room. By August 1994, when ECW broke away from the NWA and renamed itself Extreme Championship Wrestling, Dangerously formed the last incarnation of the Dangerous Alliance composed of The Tazmaniac, Sabu, and 911. Tazmaniac and Sabu wound up winning the ECW World Tag Team Championship in February 1995, before losing the titles three weeks later. In April 1995, Sabu was fired by Dangerously, due to choosing a tour with New Japan Pro-Wrestling (NJPW) over a booking on April 8. In July 1995, The Tazmaniac, now under the name Taz, suffered a serious neck injury during a tag team match in Florida. With Sabu fired and Taz injured, Dangerously finally disbanded The Dangerous Alliance.

Members

AWA members 
 Adrian Adonis 
 Dennis Condrey – one half of the original Midnight Express
 Paul E. Dangerously – leader and manager of the Alliance
 Randy Rose – one half of the original Midnight Express

CWA/ Continental members 
 Eddie Gilbert 
 Paul E. Dangerously – manager of Gilbert
 Missy Hyatt - valet and wife (both in real life and onscreen) of Gilbert

WCW members 
 Paul E. Dangerously – Leader and manager of the Alliance
 Arn Anderson
 Bobby Eaton
 Larry Zbyszko
 Madusa – Director of Covert Operations / Valet
 Michael "P.S." Hayes – Manager
 Rick Rude 
 Steve Austin

ECW members 
 Paul Heyman – Manager / Senior Partner
 911
 The Dark Patriot
 Don Muraco
 Eddie Gilbert 
 Jimmy Snuka
 Shane Douglas - Partner
 Sherri Martel - Director of Covert Operations
 Sabu
 Taz/Tazmaniac

The New Dangerous Alliance 
 Billy Wiles
 CW Anderson
 Erik Watts
 Elektra – Valet
 Lou E. Dangerously – Manager
 Johnny Swinger
 Simon Diamond

Championships 
 American Wrestling Association
 AWA World Tag Team Championship (1 time) – Randy Rose and Dennis Condrey
 Extreme Championship Wrestling
 ECW World Heavyweight Championship (1 time) – Don Muraco
 ECW World Tag Team Championship (2 times) – The Dark Patriot and Eddie Gilbert (1), The Tazmaniac and Sabu (1)
 ECW World Television Championship (1 time) – Jimmy Snuka
 World Championship Wrestling
 WCW United States Heavyweight Championship (1 time) – Rick Rude
 WCW World Tag Team Championship (2 times) – Bobby Eaton and Arn Anderson (1),  Arn Anderson and Larry Zbyszko (1)
 WCW World Television Championship (3 times) – Steve Austin (2), Arn Anderson (1)

See also
 Diamond Exchange
 The Enforcers
 The Heenan Family
 The Hollywood Blonds
 The Midnight Express
 The Stud Stable
 Team Madness

References

American Wrestling Association teams and stables
Extreme Championship Wrestling teams and stables
World Championship Wrestling teams and stables